Four-time defending champions Alfie Hewett and Gordon Reid defeated Gustavo Fernández and Shingo Kunieda in the final, 6–2, 6–1 to win the men's doubles wheelchair tennis title at the 2021 US Open. With the win, they became the first men's doubles wheelchair team to complete the Grand Slam.

Seeds

Draw

Finals

References

External links 
 Draw

Wheelchair Men's Doubles
U.S. Open, 2021 Men's Doubles